Yates v. United States, 354 U.S. 298 (1957), was a case decided by the Supreme Court of the United States that held that the First Amendment protected radical and reactionary speech, unless it posed a "clear and present danger."

Background
Fourteen lower echelon officials of the Communist Party USA (CPUSA) were charged with violating the Smith Act by being members of the CPUSA in California. The Smith Act made it unlawful to advocate or organize the destruction or overthrow of any government in the United States by force. The appellants claimed that the Communist Party was engaged in passive political activities and that any violation of the Smith Act must involve active attempts to overthrow the government.

Opinion
To a large extent, the holding of the Yates case after the Dennis case reflects the judicial philosophy of Chief Justice Warren who advocates for greater freedom of speech in comparison to Fred M. Vinson.

The Supreme Court of the United States ruled 6–1 to overturn the convictions. It construed the Smith Act narrowly, stating that the term "organize" meant to form an organization, not to take action on behalf of an organization. The Court drew a distinction between actual advocacy to action and mere belief. The Court ruled that the Smith Act did not prohibit "advocacy of forcible overthrow of the government as an abstract doctrine." The Court recognized that "advocacy to action" circumstances would be "few and far between."

Writing for the majority, Justice John Marshall Harlan introduced the notion of balancing society's right of self-preservation against the right to free speech. He wrote:

In a concurring opinion Justice Hugo Black wrote:

With respect to evidence required to convict in the absence of an appropriate standard, Black wrote:

Yates did not rule the Smith Act unconstitutional, but limited its application to such a degree that it became nearly unenforceable. The Yates decision outraged some conservative members of Congress, who introduced legislation to limit judicial review of certain sentences related to sedition and treason, which did not pass.

The appellants' convictions were reversed and the case was remanded to District Court for a retrial.

Reaction
The decision was announced on the same day as several other decisions in which communists were on the winning side, including Watkins v. United States and Sweezy v. New Hampshire (with the same majority and dissent). The day was called "Red Monday" by some anti-communists who disagreed with the decision. FBI Director J. Edgar Hoover called the decisions "the greatest victory the Communist Party in America ever received." President Eisenhower evaded questions about the decisions at a press conference, but wrote a letter to the Chief Justice after reports that he was "mad as hell" about them. The day was viewed as an indication of the Court's assertiveness under its new Chief Justice, with Time magazine headlining its coverage "U.S. Supreme Court: New Direction". Journalist I. F. Stone said the day "will go down in the history books as the day on which the Supreme Court irreparably crippled the witch hunt."

See also
 Smith Act trials of communist party leaders
 Brandenburg v. Ohio
 Hess v. Indiana

References

External links

 University of Pittsburgh: The Persecution of Oleta O'Connor Yates (1951)

United States Supreme Court cases
United States Free Speech Clause case law
McCarthyism
1957 in United States case law
Communist Party USA litigation
American Civil Liberties Union litigation
Overruled United States Supreme Court decisions
United States Supreme Court cases of the Warren Court